Hilo Tropical Gardens (2 acres), located at 1477 Kalanianaole Avenue, Hilo, Hawaii, Hawaii was a privately run botanical garden with a guest house for budget travelers.

See also 
 List of botanical gardens in the United States

External links 
Hilo Tropical Gardens

Botanical gardens in Hawaii
Protected areas of Hawaii (island)
Buildings and structures in Hilo, Hawaii